Leptokarya (Leptokaryá) is a town in Pieria regional unit, Central Macedonia, Greece, former seat of East Olympos municipality, which is part of the municipality of Dion-Olympos. The distance from Katerini is 26 km and the population of the village was 4,225 inhabitants as of 2011.

Location 
Lies on the coast of Aegean Sea, under the Mount Olympos. It is located near ancient Leivithra, allegedly the home of Orpheus, major figure in the Greek Mythology. Since the major events and customs in the town is the revival of division of Orpheus.

Tourism
Leptokarya is a popular tourist destination during the summer months due to its beaches, as well as due to its proximity to Mount Olympus.

Transport
The town is served by Leptokarya train station, with local stopping services to Thessaloniki, Kalambaka and Palaiofarsalos and Since 2008, by Proastiakos Thessaloniki to Larissa and Thessaloniki.

See also
List of settlements in the Pieria regional unit
Dion-Olympos
Platamon

References

Notes
"Καζταρίδη Ι. Φ., ''Η Πιερία των περιηγητών και των γεωγράφων'"

Populated places in Pieria (regional unit)
Tourist attractions in Central Macedonia
Beaches of Greece
Mount Olympus